Kashkan may refer to:

Kashkan River
Kashkan Rural District